Presidential elections were held in Guatemala on 27 August 1920. The result was a victory for Carlos Herrera, who received 95% of the vote.

Results

Bibliography
Caida de una tiranía. Páginas de la historia de Centro América. Guatemala: Impreso en los Talleres Sánchez. Moore, Clement Henry. 1965.
Campang Chang, José. El estado y los partidos políticos en Guatemala. 1944–1951. Guatemala: Universidad de San Carlos. 1992.
Díaz Romeu, Guillermo. “ Del régimen de Carlos Herrera a la elección de Jorge Ubico.” Historia general de Guatemala. 1993–1999. Guatemala: Asociación de Amigos del País, Fundación para la Cultura y el Desarrollo. Volume 5. 1996.
Grandin, Greg. The last colonial massacre: Latin America in the Cold War. Chicago: University of Chicago Press. 2004.
Jones, Chester Lloyd. Guatemala, past and present. New York: Russell and Russell. (Reprint of 1940 edition). 1966.

1920 08
Guatemala
1920 in Guatemala
1920